In telecommunication, a transmission level point (TLP) is a physical test point in an electronic circuit, typically a transmission channel, where a test signal may be inserted or measured.  Typically, various parameters, such as the power of the signal, noise, or test tones inserted are specified or measured at the TLP.

The nominal transmission level at a TLP is a function of system design and is an expression of the design gain or attenuation (loss).

Voice-channel transmission levels at test points are measured in decibel-milliwatts (dBm) at a frequency of ca. 1000 hertz. The dBm is an absolute level with respect to 1 mW. The TLP is thus characterized by the relation:

TLP = dBm — dBm0

When the nominal signal power is 0dBm at the TLP,  the test point is called a zero transmission level point, or zero-dBm TLP. In general, the term TLP is commonly used as if it were a unit, preceded by the nominal level for the test point. At a −16TLP, the measured level of 0dBm is +16dBm0.

The level at a TLP where an end instrument, such as a telephone set, is connected is usually specified as 0dBm.

See also
 Alignment level
 Nominal level

References

Telecommunications engineering